Mongolocampe zhaoningi is a species of Hymenoptera from the Tetracampidae family. The scientific name of this species was first published in 1990 by Yang.

References

Chalcidoidea
Insects described in 1990